The Fuze Keeping Clock (FKC) was a simplified version of the Royal Navy's High Angle Control System analogue fire control computer. It first appeared as the FKC MkII in destroyers of the 1938 , while later variants were used on sloops, frigates, destroyers, aircraft carriers and several cruisers. The FKC MkII was a non-tachymetric anti-aircraft fire control computer.

Operation
The FKC received vertical reference information from a Gyro Level Corrector and aircraft altitude, range, direction, and speed input information from the Rangefinder-Director, and output to the guns the elevation and deflection data needed to hit the target, along with the correct fuze timing information, so that the shells fired would explode in the vicinity of the target aircraft. Most guns controlled by the FKC had Fuze Setting Pedestals or Fuze Setting Trays where the correct fuze timing was set on a clockwork mechanism within the AA shell warhead.

Development
Type 285 radar was an early addition to the FKC system, being fitted on new destroyers from mid-1941 onward, and retrofitted to existing destroyers as time and opportunity permitted.

Wartime use

The FKC saw extensive use during the war on British Commonwealth naval ships, typically on destroyers and sloops. Prior to the widespread use of radar, optical detection and ranging on high altitude aerial targets was a daunting task, as shown by 's Report of Proceedings, for 3 September 1940:

Occasionally conditions would conspire to favour the surface ships during an aerial attack, as again revealed by HMAS Parramattas Report of Proceedings, for 20 September 1940:

The FKC was used throughout the war and its effectiveness was increased by the use of radar for gunnery and to provide warning against surprise attack, as demonstrated by this account of  bringing down a Japanese A6M Zero fighter aircraft (a "HAMP"), in 1944:

Notes

External links
 The Gunnery Pocket Book, B.R. 224/45, 1945 
 
 Illustration of the FKC Mk II 

Anti-aircraft artillery
Military computers
Naval artillery
Artillery operation
Equipment of the Royal Navy
Fire-control computers of World War II
Military equipment introduced in the 1930s